"Blow at High Dough" is a song by Canadian rock band The Tragically Hip, released in April 1989 as the lead single from their first full-length studio album, Up to Here. It reached  on the RPM CANCON chart, and was the opening theme song of the CBC Television series Made in Canada.

Charts

References

1989 singles
The Tragically Hip songs
1989 songs
MCA Records singles
Songs written by Rob Baker (guitarist)
Songs written by Gord Downie